"Written on the Wind" is a song by The Who's lead vocalist, Roger Daltrey. The song was written by Paul Korda, the song also features Korda playing piano. The song was released as a single on Polydor in the UK in April 1977, and reached and peaked at number 46 in the charts but only stayed in the charts for two weeks, The single was never released in the US.

The song was included on Daltrey's third solo studio album One of the Boys in 1977. The album reached 46 in the US (the same position as the single in the UK).

References

Polydor Records singles
1977 singles
1977 songs